Henry VIII was King of England (and Lord/King of Ireland) from 1509 to his death in 1547.

Henry VIII may also refer to:

People
Henry VIII, Duke of Bavaria or Henry IV, Holy Roman Emperor (1050–1106)
Henry VIII, Count of Waldeck (1465–1513), count of Waldeck and the founder of the older line of Waldeck-Wildungen
Henry VIII the Sparrow (c. 1357–1397), Polish duke and ruler
Henry VIII, Duke of Brunswick-Wolfenbüttel, state leader in 1499
Henry VIII, Duke of Silesia (d. 1423),  European noble
Henry VIII of Brunswick, European noble
Henry VIII of Henneberg, son-in-law of Anne of Austria, Margravine of Brandenburg
Henry VIII of Henneberg-Schleusingen, great-grandfather of Frederick II, Elector of Saxony

Schools
 King Henry VIII School, Coventry, England
 King Henry VIII Grammar School, Abergavenny, Wales
 King Henry VIII Grammar School, Warwick, Warwick, England

Other uses 
 Henry VIII (play), a 1613 play by Shakespeare (and John Fletcher)
 Henry VIII (film), a 1911 British silent film
 Henry VIII (opera), an 1883 opera by Camille Saint-Saëns
 Henry VIII (TV serial), a 2003 ITV drama

See also
 Henry VIII clauses (also known as Henry VIII powers), a UK statutory instrument that enables legislation to be modified without parliamentary approval
 "I'm Henery the Eighth, I Am", a 1910 song made popular by music hall singer Harry Champion and later Herman's Hermits
 Heinrich VIII (disambiguation)